The Kennebago River is a  river in northwestern part of the U.S. state of Maine.  It is a tributary of Cupsuptic Lake, an arm of Mooselookmeguntic Lake. Via a chain of lakes and the Rapid River, it is part of the Androscoggin River watershed.

Kennebago Lake
The lake extends southeasterly from the river in Stetsontown township into the northeast corner of Davis township. Kennebago Lake has a native population of brook trout, rainbow smelt, and land-locked Atlantic salmon.

See also
List of rivers of Maine

References

Maine Streamflow Data from the USGS
Maine Watershed Data From Environmental Protection Agency

Tributaries of the Kennebec River
Rivers of Maine